Norizam Salaman (born 6 March 1984 in Johor) is a Malaysian footballer played as a striker.

Career

Penang FA
Norizam joins Penang FA for the 2013 season. He first season with Penang his scored 12 goals in the league thus helping the team to gain promotion to the Malaysia Premier League.

AirAsia FC
AirAsia FC announced the signing of Norizam on 26 January 2015.

Honours
Negeri Sembilan
Malaysia FA Cup: 2010

Penang
Malaysia FAM League: 2013

Individual
Malaysia FAM League Top goalscorer: 2013

External links
 

Living people
1984 births
Malaysian footballers
Penang F.C. players
Negeri Sembilan FA players
People from Johor
Footballers at the 2006 Asian Games
Association football forwards
Asian Games competitors for Malaysia